The Headless Eyes is a 1971 American exploitation horror film written and directed by Kent Bateman.

Plot

The film depicts an artist named Arthur Malcolm (Bo Brundin) who sneaks into a woman's bedroom and tries to steal the money off her nightstand to pay his rent.  Mistaking the thief for a rapist, the woman pushes his eye out with a spoon from her evening tea and knocks him out the second-story window.  After being gawked at with his eye dangling from his head and the ultimate loss of his eye, Arthur becomes a serial killer and uses his victims' eyes in his artwork.

Cast
 Bo Brundin as Arthur Malcolm
 Gordon Ramon 
 Kelley Swartz  
 Mary Jane Early

Production
The film was produced by Ron Sullivan (credited as Henri Pachard), a cinematographer with a background in pornographic films. The film's director, Kent Bateman, is the father of actors Justine and Jason Bateman.

Release
The film was distributed by J.E.R. Pictures, an independent company based in Times Square, New York City, who paired it as a double feature with The Ghastly Ones (1968). It opened in Canandaigua, New York on October 27, 1971 as part of this double feature. Though it received an X rating due to violence, the film was a box-office success.

Home media
The film was released on DVD by Wizard Video on July 16, 2013. Code Red released a Blu-ray edition of the film featuring two alternate cuts on December 6, 2016.

Reception

Joseph A. Ziemba from Bleeding Skull! gave the film a positive review, writing, "Unkempt and gloomy, yet somehow radiant, the mind-bending Headless Eyes is a touchpoint for every element that makes nonconformist 70s trash-horror cinema so enduring today. As soon as “The End” rolls around, you’ll want to watch it again." On his website Fantastic Movie Musings and Ramblings, Dave Sindelar gave the film a negative review, calling it "pointless, pretentious, annoying, and no fun at all".

Film scholars Bill Landis and Michelle Clifford write in Sleazoid Express (2002): "With murder scenes choreographed like slow-moving sex assaults, The Headless Eyes is true to the psychosexual underpinnings of blood horror...  Ultimately, [it] earns its place in the exploitation pantheon because it's as isolated, weird, and discordant as its main character."

References

Sources

External links
 
 
 

1971 films
1970s exploitation films
1971 horror films
1971 independent films
1970s serial killer films
American independent films
American serial killer films
American slasher films
American splatter films
1970s English-language films
1970s American films